Shurandy Ruggerio Sambo (born 19 August 2001) is a Dutch professional footballer who plays as a right-back for Eredivisie club Sparta Rotterdam, on loan from Jong PSV.

Club career

PSV
Sambo played youth football for SV Braakhuizen and PSV Eindhoven. In the winter break of the 2019–20 season, he was promoted to the reserve team, Jong PSV, competing in the second-tier Eerste Divisie. He made his debut on 13 January 2020 in a 0–0 league draw at home against Jong Ajax.

In the 2020–21 season, Sambo made 35 appearances for Jong PSV, scoring six goals. He made his debut for the first team in the final matchday of the Eredivisie on 16 May 2021, coming off the bench for Armando Obispo in the 77th minute against FC Utrecht.

On 15 August 2021, Sambo tore his anterior cruciate ligament during practice, sidelining him for the entire 2021–22 season. At the end of the season, on 28 April 2022, he extended his contract with PSV until 2024.

Sparta Rotterdam (loan)
Sambo joined Eredivisie club Sparta Rotterdam on loan for the 2022–23 season, with an option to buy.

International career
Born in the Netherlands, Sambo is of Curaçaoan descent. He is a youth international for the Netherlands. He was called up to the preliminary squad for the Curaçao national team for the 2021 CONCACAF Gold Cup.

Career statistics

Honours

Netherlands U17
 UEFA European Under-17 Championship: 2018

References

2001 births
Living people
Dutch footballers
Netherlands youth international footballers
Dutch people of Curaçao descent
Association football defenders
PSV Eindhoven players
Jong PSV players
Sparta Rotterdam players
Eerste Divisie players
Eredivisie players
People from Geldrop
Footballers from North Brabant